Villiers-Fossard is a commune in the Manche department in Normandy in north-western France.

History

During World War II, the town was in the middle of heavy fighting that took place on the 29th of June 1944. Allied forces managed to liberate the town despite suffering heavy casualties - including 151 men, 31 tanks and 12 miscellaneous vehicles.

Heraldry

See also
Communes of the Manche department

References

Villiersfossard